Augustine Scriven (185221 July 1916) was an eminent Anglican priest in the last decades of the nineteenth century and the first two of the  twentieth.

He was born in Spernall, Sambourne, Warwickshire and educated at St Mary Hall, Oxford and ordained in 1875. After  curacies at Kirkham and Frindsbury  he held incumbencies at Martinhoe and  St Peter, Rochester. In 1884 he became Archdeacon of Vancouver a post he held until his appointment to the episcopate as  Bishop of British Columbia in 1915.

References

1852 births
People from Stratford-on-Avon District
Alumni of St Mary Hall, Oxford
Anglican archdeacons in North America
Anglican bishops of British Columbia
20th-century Anglican Church of Canada bishops
1916 deaths